Igor Arsenijević (Serbian Cyrillic: Игор Арсенијевић; born 29 May 1986 in Belgrade) is a Serbian former football player and current assistant coach of Lunds BK.

Career

Club career
On 2 February 2020, Swedish second division club IFK Malmö confirmed, that Arsenijević had joined the club on a free transfer. 

At the end of the year, Arsenijević decided to retire and was hired as an assistant coach at Lunds BK.

References

External sources
 Profile at Elitefootball.
 

1986 births
Living people
Footballers from Belgrade
Serbian footballers
Serbian expatriate footballers
Association football midfielders
FK Mornar players
Landskrona BoIS players
IFK Malmö Fotboll players
Montenegrin First League players
Ettan Fotboll players
Superettan players
Serbian expatriate sportspeople in Sweden
Expatriate footballers in Sweden